The Diveria (Walliser German: Churumm Bach; German: KrummBach) is an Alpine river which flows through Switzerland (Canton Valais) and Italy (Province of Verbano Cusio Ossola). It is a tributary of the  Toce and therefore, via Lake Maggiore and the Ticino, of the Po. The valley crossed by the Diveria, the Val Divedro, is the only one in the Valais to form part of the Po basin rather than that of the Rhône.

Course
From here it follows a south-easterly course through the Gondo gorge to the hamlet of Gondo in the municipality of Zwischbergen. Turning to the east it enters Italy and passes the villages of Paglino, Iselle di Trasquera, Bertonio and Varzo; turning south it passes Ricegno, Mognata, Campeglia and Crevoladossola where it enters the Toce.

Notes

Sources
This original version of this article included text translated from its counterpart in the Italian Wikipedia, and from that in the French Wikipedia

Rivers of Switzerland
Rivers of Italy
Rivers of the Province of Verbano-Cusio-Ossola
Rivers of Valais
Rivers of the Alps